Ivica Buljan (born 29 March 1965) is a Croatian theater director, playwright, theater critic, and educator whose work is widely known in Croatia and performed around the globe.

Career
Buljan studied political science, French, and comparative literature at the University of Zagreb. During his studies, worked as a writer for magazines including Polet and Start. He has served as a regular theater critic for Slobodna Dalmacija, a daily newspaper published in Split, Croatia. He is also a member of the editorial boards of the theater show Novi Prolog and the theoretical theater journal Frakcija (English: Fraction). Buljan is also associated with the international theater magazines Primer Acto (Madrid), Ubu (Paris, London), Mask (Ljubljana).

Buljan's work as a theater director includes both directing works and running multiple groups and festivals.  Buljan's work has been performed at international festivals in more than 30 different countries. Drawing on Antonin Artaud, his theater focuses on the actor's presence.

Buljan served as the director of the Croatian National Theatre in Split from 1998 to 2002. In 1999, during his tenure, the Croatian National Theatre joined the European Theater Convention. Buljan is also the co-founder and artistic director of the Mini theater in Ljubljana as well as the founder and director of the New Theatre in Zagreb.

Together with Dubravko Vrgoč, Buljan founded the World Theatre Festival in Zagreb in 2003, and both serve as co-curators and  artistic directors.

As an educator, Buljan has taught in Paris, Brussels, and Moscow, and as a guest lecturer at La MaMa in New York. He is a professor at the National Theatre Academy in Saint-Étienne, France.

As a playwright, he worked in Croatia, France, Slovenia and collaborated on more than twenty international projects with directors such as Vito Taufer, Matjaž Pograjc, Christian Colin, Pierre Diependaele, Jean-Michel Bruyere, Krizstof Warlikowski, Eduard Miler, Ivan Popovski and Robert Waltl.

He is a member of International Association of ETC in Brussels, the Institute of Mediterranean Theatre in Madrid, and the International Theatre Institute (ITI-UNESCO) in Paris.

Awards
 Borštnik Award (best play in Slovenia, multiple-time winner)
 Sterija Award
 Vjesnik Award
 Dubravko Dujšin Award, 1997, for Phaedra
 Branko Gavella Award
 Petar Brečić Award
 City of Havana Award, 2005, for Medea Material
 Prešern Foundation Award
 Member of Republic of France's Order of Arts and Letters

Selected publications
 Antologija novije francuske drame. Zagreb : Hrvatski centar ITI-UNESCO, 2006.
 Buljan, Ivica, Petra Pogorevc, Polona Petek. "The actorʹs inteptness and my own are the inevitable : an interview with Ivica Buljan." Maska 19: 91-93.
 "Iconoclasm: A View on Theatre." Frakcija 15 (1999): 8–13.
 "Koltes[!] & Succo : love at first sight" Slovensko mladinsko gledališče. Ljubljana, (1995): 4-8. 
 "Carmen: ah, Carmen ali nekritcni hedonizem Tomaza Pandurja." Maska 2: 8-9.

References

External links
Buljan's website
Buljan biography on Mini-Theater Ljubljana website
Buljan biography on Croatian National Theater website
World Theatre Festival Zagreb
Review of Pylade performed at La Mama ETC in New York City in 2015

Living people
Croatian theatre directors
1965 births
People from Sinj